Louisa Hill (born 2 March 1962) is a New Zealand dressage rider. She represented New Zealand at the 2004 Summer Olympics in the individual dressage, finishing 49th and at the 2012 Summer Olympics in the individual dressage, finishing 48th.

References

Living people
1962 births
Olympic equestrians of New Zealand
New Zealand female equestrians
New Zealand dressage riders
Equestrians at the 2004 Summer Olympics
Equestrians at the 2012 Summer Olympics
People from Takapuna
Sportspeople from Auckland